Spertus may refer to:

Spertus Institute, one of the leading Jewish organizations in Chicago, Illinois, U.S.
Ellen Spertus, Associate Professor of Computer Science at Mills College and a research scientist at Google